Chlosyne nycteis, the silvery checkerspot, is a species of Nymphalinae butterfly that occurs in North America. It is listed as a species of special concern in Connecticut and Maine, and is believed extirpated in Connecticut, Massachusetts, and New Hampshire.

Description

Adult
The dorsal view is pale yellow orange with dark borders and markings. The hindwing has white-centered submarginal spots on both sides, dorsal and ventral. The hindwing is pale and has a white crescent at the margin.

Caterpillar
The caterpillar is almost all black with dusted white spots. Sometimes, it has a yellow-orange stripe or two smaller stripes along the side. The family Nymphalidae is known for its branched spines.

Range and habitat
Their range consist of southern Canada south to Georgia and Texas, but does not occur in the Gulf Coastal Plain. Silvery checkerspots enjoy moist areas such as streamsides.  They can also be seen in meadows and forest openings.

Lifecycle
In the northern portion of its habitat, one brood hatches between June and July; for the remainder of its range, two broods occur from May to September. Three broods have been reported in the deep southern part of Texas. Females lay eggs in batches which can be up to 100 individuals. Early instar caterpillars stay in groups as they skeletonize leaves while the third instar hibernates.

Larval foods
Larval foods are various Asters, including Eurybia macrophylla, Verbesina alternifolia, Helianthus, and Rudbeckia.

Adult foods
Adult foods include from nectar from Red clover, Common milkweed and Dogbane.

References

"Chlosyne Butler, 1870" at Markku Savela's Lepidoptera and Some Other Life Forms. Accessed 2017-04-07

Silvery Checkerspot, Butterflies of Ontario

nycteis
Butterflies of North America
Butterflies described in 1847
Taxa named by Henry Doubleday